Mi Plan is the fourth studio album and the first Spanish-language album by Canadian singer-songwriter Nelly Furtado. It was released independently on September 11, 2009 by Furtado’s own record label Nelstar Entertainment with distribution by Universal Music Latino. This marks Furtado’s first independently released album. Recording sessions for the album took place from 2008 to 2009. The album was produced primarily by Furtado with other contributions made by James Bryan, Lester Mendez, Salaam Remi, The Demolition Crew, Julieta Venegas and Brian West. Furtado described the songs on the album to be "simple love songs".

Mi Plan was generally well received by music critics, most applauding Furtado's vocals. The album reached number one on the US Latin Billboard chart, and was later certified platinum (Latin field) album by the Recording Industry Association of America (RIAA). The album won a Latin Grammy Award for Best Female Pop Vocal Album in 2010. The lead single from the album, "Manos al Aire" was released in June 2009. The song became Furtado's first solo number one single on the US Billboard Top Latin Songs chart. She also became the first North American artist to top the chart with an original Spanish song. Two further singles came from the album, "Más", released in December 2009, and "Bajo Otra Luz", released in June 2010. The album was further supported by her 2010 Mi Plan Tour, her first tour reaching Latin America. Mi Plan Remixes, a remix album was released in October 2010, featuring remixes of the singles.

Background
Furtado began working with guitarist and producer James Bryan on "My Plan", for a possible English language album. She said she would try to write songs in English and then in Portuguese but that she did not feel inspired. She mentioned that fellow Canadian singer-songwriter Alex Cuba suggested that they try writing the lyrics in Spanish and then he would go on to write the melodies. After approving of the idea, she said that she, Cuba and Bryan started "really organically writing songs" in Spanish. Cuba then helped them pen more songs, including the title track, "Mi Plan", and "Manos al Aire". "Mi Plan" features Cuba on vocals. According to Cuba, the three got together five times between September 2008 and February 2009 and wrote nine songs, six of which made it onto the album. Furtado also worked with Julieta Venegas, who wrote the song "Bajo Otra Luz" and also contributed to another song called "Vacación", playing the accordion. Altogether, Furtado wrote 24 Spanish-language songs, 12 of which made the final track list.

Content
In an interview with the Associated Press, Furtado said that the album was a personal statement and that the central theme was love. She noted that her previous albums had songs that "explored certain aspects of love, but they're not really direct love songs" and the songs on Mi Plan were more simple. She also claimed that she "wanted to abandon the dance-pop vibe of her last record and try a different sound." Furtado explained that she decided she wanted to perform in Spanish because she did not follow commercial or sales trends and that the album was "the next phase". She said that writing songs in Spanish felt "very liberating" allowing her to "express other emotions" singing in Spanish because, as she put it, "In English, especially as a woman, the moment you start to be angry, you get labelled bad-tempered like Alanis Morissette, or if you're too sad, you get written off as fragile and sappy."

The first track on the album is "Manos al Aire", an uptempo dance-influenced track, which Furtado says is about "having a heated argument" with her love interest. During the chorus, she puts up the "white flag" and "surrenders" to him. Another song from the album entitled, "Bajo Otra Luz", Furtado proclaimed, is about "when you are in a relationship and you are under a light. You feel like something is glowing on you and there is something different about the world. You can’t put your finger on it." The seventh track, "Suficiente Tiempo", is a description of the busy life of an overworked wife who is "trying to make time for a date night". Furtado said that the album was "purposefully collaboration-heavy" because she "want[ed] it to sound like a community effort. I wanted it to have all those layers of experience" She also collaborated with Josh Groban on a song entitled, "Silencio" and called the collaboration a "huge blessing." She felt it was important to feature "an artist that people know more for their English recordings" because she wanted to demonstrate that "language isn't a barrier when it comes to music."

Promotion
Prior to the album's release, three promotional singles were released exclusively on Apple's iTunes Store as a "Countdown to Mi Plan." "Más" was the first promotional single released on 21 July 2009. The next month, "Mi Plan" was released, followed by "Bajo Otra Luz" in early September. "Silencio"  was digitally released as a promotional single only for U.S. from Rhapsody on 1 September 2009. On 26 October 2010, a 12-track album titled Mi Plan Remixes was released, featuring singles released from Mi Plan. An English version of "Fuerte" was released as a promotional single from Mi Plan and Mi Plan Remixes on 26 October 2010. Before she began touring, Furtado appeared at various award shows and small venues, performing in places such as the 2009 ALMA Awards. Furtado also appeared at the Latin Grammy Awards of 2010, performing a medley of "Fuerte" and "Bajo Otra Luz", alongside La Mala Rodríguez and The JabbaWockeeZ. The album was also supported by the Mi Plan Tour, which began on 16 March 2010, in Mexico and Venezuela and continued further into Latin America, with six more venues in Ecuador, Chile, Argentina and Brazil. Furtado performed at Yas Arena in Abu Dhabi, supported by Taio Cruz and Tinchy Stryder.

Singles
"Manos al Aire" was released on 30 June 2009 as the lead single from the album, sent to worldwide radio with digital and mobile retail availability the next day. It was Furtado's first single to top the U.S. Billboard Top Latin Tracks. With the song, Furtado made history by becoming the first North American artist to reach number one on the Billboard Hot Latin Tracks chart with an original Spanish song that was not translated from another language. It achieved international success, peaking at number two in Germany, Czech Republic, and Italy while it reached the top twenty in various other countries such as Switzerland, France and Spain.

"Más" was the second single released from the album. It was released as a download single on 18 December 2009, in Germany. It did not perform as well as "Manos al Aire", peaking at number 25 on the Billboard Latin Pop Airplay chart. An Italian version of the song was digitally released on 22 January 2010.

"Bajo Otra Luz" was digitally released from iTunes in Canada and Mexico on 31 August 2009. It premiered as the final single from the album on US radio in early May 2010 with digital downloading available on 15 June 2010. It was the least successful single from the album, not charting anywhere.

All singles had proper official music videos released to promote them. In addition to these, Furtado made three promotional black and white videos of the recording sessions of the album tracks "Sueños" (featuring Alejandro Fernández), "Silencio" (featuring Josh Groban) and "Como Lluvia" (featuring Juan Luis Guerra). These can be viewed through her official Argentina fan club YouTube channel.

Mi Plan Tour

The tour was announced on 5 January 2010 via Furtado's official website. For the tour, Furtado asked her fans for help choosing the setlist, asking which songs should be on the show. The concert in Santiago was one of the firsts after the 2010 Chile earthquake that happened 3 weeks before. Nelly Furtado donated 5% of the revenues to the people affected by the catastrophe. To promote the tour in Brazil, on 24 March 2010, Furtado made a "VIP Pocket Show" appeared in the reality show program Big Brother Brasil 10 from Rede Globo, the country's leading channel. She performed 5 songs from the tour in acoustic versions ("Maneater", "I'm Like a Bird", "Try", "Say It Right" and "Turn Off The Light").

Critical reception

The album was generally well received by critics: it scored 71/100 among professional music critics cited by Metacritic. In a positive review, Stephen Thomas Erlewine of AllMusic wrote that the album is "assured and cohesive" and claimed that it is her "strongest album yet". Billboard described the album as "straightforward songs that appeal to melodic sensibilities rather than rhythmic contraptions, the set is a mix of vulnerability and earnestness." The Boston Globe said "Furtado bridges pop sensibilities with Latin music" and also mentioned the songs, "Sueños" and "Silencio", saying that they "bring out the purity in Furtado’s vocals".

Digital Spy writer, Mayor Nissim, asserted that "aside from the vocals and lyrics, much of the music here wouldn't sound out of place in the UK or US charts, which is both a good and bad thing." He also went on to say that "the fact Manos and several other songs feature rather Americanised production can prevent them from completely hitting the mark" because, as he put it, "Furtado's tunes don't always get the Spanish wallop her vocals deserve." MusicOMH said in its review that "For the most part, the album is a pretty good listen" and claimed that songs from the album are "pleasant but never overly diverting." Paul Lester, a writer for BBC, gave the album a mixed review and said the music is "equally inoffensive". The writer compared it to her previous release, Loose and claimed that "Timbaland's inventive approach to dance motion is much missed". Entertainment Weekly also stated, "Without the Midas touch of studio magician Timbaland, Furtado has only her nasal, pleasant-enough vocals and a distinctly middlebrow musicality." Kevin Liedel of Slant Magazine was very critical, writing, "[it] manifests itself here in a labored and predictable fashion" and also said it is "heartless, with forced sincerity".

Commercial performance
Mi Plan debuted at number 39 on the Billboard 200, including number 1 on the Top Latin Albums and Latin Pop Albums charts selling nearly 13,000 copies in its first week.  On 6 November 2009, the album received a platinum certification (Latin field) by the Recording Industry Association of America (RIAA) for selling over 100,000 copies. According to Nielson SoundScan, the album was the highest selling Latin pop album in 2009.

In Switzerland, Mi Plan entered the charts at number three and stayed in the top ten for five weeks. There, the album was certified gold for shipping over 15,000 units. 

At the 11th Annual Latin Grammy Awards, Furtado won the Latin Grammy Award for Best Female Pop Vocal Album.

Track listing

Notes
  signifies a co-producer.
  signifies an additional producer.

Personnel
Credits below are adapted from the Mi Plan liner notes.

Production
Andrés Recio – executive producer, A&R
Nelly Furtado – executive producer, producer, mixing
Chris Smith – executive producer
James Bryan – producer, guitar, drums, keyboards, engineer
Julieta Venegas – producer, accordion
Lester Méndez – producer, percussion, guitar, keyboards, mixing, engineer, string arrangements
Brian West – producer
The Demolition Crew – producer
Salaam Remi – producer, drums, keyboards
Vanessa Freebairn-Smith, Alex Grant – cello
Alex Grant – cello
Daniel Stone, Raphael Padilla, Roger Travassos – percussion
Dan Warner – guitar, bass guitar
Dan Turco, Vincent Henry – guitar
StayBent Krunk-a-Delic – guitar, keyboards
Ramón Stagnaro – guitar, cuatro
Matt Scannell – guitar, bass guitar
Michael Anthony Turco – producer, drums
Lee Levin – drums
Julio Hernandez, Alex Cuba – bass guitar
Chris Gehringer – general mastering
Demacio Castellón – mixing
Franklin Emmanuel Socorro – mixing, engineer
Jason "Metal" Donkersgoed – mixing, engineer
Joel Numa – mixing, engineer
Ron Taylor – digital editing
Jorge Vivo – engineer
Antonio Resendiz – engineer
Julian Vazquez – engineer
Allan Leschhorn – engineer
Ryan Evans – engineer
Enrique Larreal – engineer
Carlos Alvarez – engineer
Aureo Baqueiro – vocal producer
Marc Rogers – double bass
Javier Limón – flamenco guitar
Tyler Armes – piano
Nick Banns – string arrangements
Sonus Quartet – strings

Guest appearances
Alex Cuba appears courtesy of Caracol Records
Alejandro Fernández appears courtesy of Universal Music Latino
Julieta Venegas appears courtesy of Sony Music
La Mala Rodríguez appears courtesy of Universal Music Spain
Concha Buika appears courtesy of Warner Bros. and casalimon.tv
Javier Limón appears courtesy of casalimon.tv
Josh Groban appears courtesy of Warner Bros. Records
Juan Luis Guerra appears courtesy of EMI Televisa Music

Charts

Weekly charts

Year-end charts

Certifications

See also

List of number-one Billboard Top Latin Albums of 2009
List of number-one Billboard Latin Pop Albums from the 2000s

Release history

References

External links
 

2009 albums
Albums produced by Salaam Remi
Nelly Furtado albums
Spanish-language albums
Universal Music Latino albums
Latin Grammy Award for Best Female Pop Vocal Album
Latin pop albums by Canadian artists